Sri Rama Pattabhishekam is a 1978 Indian Telugu-language Hindu mythological film directed and produced by N. T. Rama Rao under Ramakrishna Cine Studios banner. Based on the Ramayana, the film stars Rama Rao, Jamuna and Sangeeta, with music composed by Pendyala Nageswara Rao.

Plot 
Dasharatha, the king of Ayodhya, announces the coronation of his son Rama, and the people of Ayodhya are filled with joy. But all the gods reach Brahma and say that Rama avatar is destined for destroying Ravana; if Rama is crowned the purpose of the avatar is defeated. Hence Saraswati speaks through Kaikeyi. At the same time Mandhara, a wicked maidservant of Kaikeyi, gives her the idea to ask Dasharatha for two boons, that he has promised to fulfill, during the time of the Devasura war. The first one is, to make her son Bharata as the king and the second one is, to exile Rama for 14 years to the forest. The heartbroken Dasharatha, constrained by his rigid devotion to his given word, accedes to Kaikeyi's demands.

Rama accepts his father's reluctant decree with absolute submission and calm self-control. Rama leaves to the forest accompanied by Lakshmana and Sita. Rama's devotee Guha takes him to another side of the Ganga in his boat. After that, Dasharatha dies due to the agony of being separated from Rama. Meanwhile, Bharata coming back from his uncle's house, knowing the fact, blames Kaikeya when the illusion occurred to her is removed and she realises her mistake. Bharata immediately rushes to the forest to bring back Rama. But Rama refuses as he has to obey his father's words. So, Bharata obtains Rama's sandals and places them on the throne as a gesture to Rama and starts ruling Ayodhya.

After thirteen years of exile, Rama, Sita and Lakshmana take the blessings of Atrimuni and Anasuya and reach Panchavathi. There Shurpanakha, sister of Ravana tries to seduce the brothers. Unsuccessful, she attempts to kill Sita, but Lakshmana cuts off her nose and ears. In revenge, Ravana resolves to destroy Rama by capturing Sita with the aid of Maricha, who turns into a golden deer. Entranced by the beauty of the "deer", Sita pleads with Rama to capture it. Rama chases the "deer" into the forest, leaving Sita under Lakshmana's guard. Rama shoots an arrow at the "deer"; before dying Maricha calls for Lakshmana and Sita in Rama's voice. Oblivious, Sita forces Lakshmana to go and rescue Rama. Lakshmana assents, but stipulates that she is not to leave the cottage or entertain any stranger and draws a chalk outline for her protection.

Meanwhile, Ravana comes in the guise of an ascetic requesting Sita's hospitality. Unaware of his plan, Sita crosses the line and she is forcibly carried away by Ravana. Jatayu tries to stop Ravana, but loses his wings in the fight and falls to the ground. Before dying, Jatayu tells Rama and Lakshmana about Sita's abduction. After completing Jatayu's funeral, they immediately set out to save Sita. On the way, they meet Kabandha, an ascetic Shabari who guides them towards Sugriva and Hanuman.

Rama and Lakshmana reach Kishkindha. Through Hanuman, they get friendship with Sugriva. Rama kills Sugriva's brother Vali and makes Sugriva king of Kishkindha. Then Vanaras start the search for Sita. Rama gives his ring to Hanuman as his identification, Hanuman crosses the seas and reaches Lanka. He locates Sita in Ashoka grove, where she is being wooed and threatened by Ravana to marry him. Hanuman gives the ring to Sita and assures her that Rama will take revenge for the insult of her abduction. Also, he takes her golden hairband Chudamani as her identification. Hanuman sets fire to Lanka and comes back to Rama.

Rama, with the help of Vanaras, constructs a bridge over the sea and reaches Lanka. Ravana also gets prepared for war. Vibhishana, a good Samaritan, brother of Ravana asks him to give back Sita and seek a pardon from Rama. An enraged Ravana ostracises him from Lanka. Vibhishana reaches Rama and asks for his propitiate. Rama promises to make him king of Lanka. Everyone gets ready for the war, but Rama wants to conduct a sacred ritual before the war for which a great Brahmin of renowned qualities is required and there is only one such person in the universe, Ravana. Rama sends an invitation to Ravana through Hanuman, without any hesitation, Ravana moves and does it. Rama takes the blessing of Ravana and begins the war.

In the battle one by one Kumbhakarna, Indrajit die and many other soldiers are defeated by Rama. Ultimately, Ravana also dies at the hands of Rama and after meeting Sita, Rama asks her to undergo an Agni Pariksha (test of fire) to prove her chastity, as he wants to clear the rumours surrounding her purity. When Sita plunges into the sacrificial fire, Agni raises Sita, unharmed, to the throne, attesting to her innocence. Rama goes back to Ayodhya along with Sita, Lakshmana, Hanuman, and other Vanaras. The film ends with the coronation of Rama along with Sita, Lakshmana, Bharata, Shatrughna at his side and Hanuman sitting at his feet.

Cast 
N. T. Rama Rao as Rama and Ravana
Jamuna as Mandodari
Sangeeta as Sita
Ramakrishna as Lakshmana
Satyanarayana as Bharata
Prabhakar Reddy as Dasaratha
Sridhar as Guhudu
Arjan Janardhan Rao as Hanuman
Tyagaraju as Kumbhakarna
Chalapathi Rao as Indrajit
Kanchana as Kaikeyi
Anjali Devi as Sabari
Suryakantham as Mandara
Chandrakala as Kausalya

Soundtrack 

The music was composed by Pendyala Nageswara Rao.

Reception 
Venkatrao of Andhra Patrika in his review dated 11 September 1978 appreciated the film's portrayal of Ravana. He felt that scenes such as Ravana teaching military tactics to Lakshmana despite knowing that he's Rama's aid were thought-provoking. Sarada writing for Zamin Ryot on 22 September 1978 was critical of Rama Rao for picking up similar roles in his films. She opined that Rama Rao had hardly shown any improvement in his acting and directing ability.

References

External links 
 

1978 films
Films based on the Ramayana
Films directed by N. T. Rama Rao
Films scored by Pendyala Nageswara Rao
Hindu mythological films
Indian war films